is the 16th compilation album by Japanese entertainer Miho Nakayama. Released through King Records on November 2, 2013, the album is a supplement to the 2010 compilation Miho Nakayama Perfect Best, covering the singles not featured in the previous release and including different versions of Nakayama's popular singles.

The album peaked at No. 133 on Oricon's albums chart.

Track listing

Charts

References

External links
 
 
 

2013 compilation albums
Miho Nakayama compilation albums
Japanese-language compilation albums
King Records (Japan) compilation albums